44th Street Suite is a 1991 album by McCoy Tyner released on the Red Baron label. It was recorded in May 1991 and features performances by Tyner with tenor saxophonist David Murray, alto saxophonist Arthur Blythe, bassist  Ron Carter and drummer Aaron Scott.

Critical reception

In his 1992 review for the Chicago Tribune, journalist Jack Fuller called the group's approach "simple and direct", and the horn players "as good as I've heard either of them". The Allmusic review by Scott Yanow states that "Little all that memorable occurs considering the players involved (a little more planning would have worked wonders) but the music does have its exciting moments".

Track listing

 Recorded May 11, 1991

Personnel
 McCoy Tyner - piano
 David Murray - tenor saxophone (tracks 1-4)
 Arthur Blythe - alto saxophone (tracks 1-3, 5-6) 
 Ron Carter - bass
 Aaron Scott - drums

References

McCoy Tyner albums
1991 albums
albums produced by Bob Thiele
Red Baron Records albums